In machine learning, the delta rule is a gradient descent learning rule for updating the weights of the inputs to artificial neurons in a single-layer neural network.  It is a special case of the more general backpropagation algorithm. For a neuron  with activation function , the delta rule for neuron 's th weight  is given by

,

where

The delta rule is commonly stated in simplified form for a neuron with a linear activation function as 

 

While the delta rule is similar to the perceptron's update rule, the derivation is different. The perceptron uses the Heaviside step function as the activation function , and that means that  does not exist at zero, and is equal to zero elsewhere, which makes the direct application of the delta rule impossible.

Derivation of the delta rule
The delta rule is derived by attempting to minimize the error in the output of the neural network through gradient descent. The error for a neural network with  outputs can be measured as 

. 

In this case, we wish to move through "weight space" of the neuron (the space of all possible values of all of the neuron's weights) in proportion to the gradient of the error function with respect to each weight. In order to do that, we calculate the partial derivative of the error with respect to each weight. For the th weight, this derivative can be written as 

.

Because we are only concerning ourselves with the th neuron, we can substitute the error formula above while omitting the summation:

Next we use the chain rule to split this into two derivatives:

To find the left derivative, we simply apply the chain rule:

Note that the output of the th neuron, is just the neuron's activation function  applied to the neuron's input .

Next we rewrite  in the last term as the sum over all  weights of each weight  times its corresponding input :

Clearly, 

, 

giving us our final equation for the gradient:

As noted above, gradient descent tells us that our change for each weight should be proportional to the gradient. Choosing a proportionality constant  and eliminating the minus sign to enable us to move the weight in the negative direction of the gradient to minimize error, we arrive at our target equation:

.

See also
 Stochastic gradient descent
 Backpropagation
 Rescorla–Wagner model – the origin of delta rule

References

Artificial neural networks